Terres de Druance is a commune in the department of Calvados, northwestern France. The municipality was established on 1 January 2017 by merger of the former communes of Lassy (the seat), Saint-Jean-le-Blanc and Saint-Vigor-des-Mézerets.

See also 
Communes of the Calvados department

References 

Communes of Calvados (department)
Populated places disestablished in 2017